Horace Taliaferro Ward (July 29, 1927 – April 23, 2016) was a lawyer, state legislator, and judge in Georgia. He become known for his efforts to challenge the racially discriminatory practices at the University of Georgia School of Law and was the first African American to serve as a United States district judge of the United States District Court for the Northern District of Georgia.

Education and career

Ward was born in LaGrange, Georgia. He received an Artium Baccalaureus degree from Morehouse College in 1949. He received a Master of Arts from Atlanta University (now Clark Atlanta University) in 1950. He received a Juris Doctor from Northwestern University Pritzker School of Law in 1959. He was an instructor at the Arkansas AM&N College (now the University of Arkansas at Pine Bluff) from 1950 to 1951. He was an instructor at Alabama State College from 1951 to 1953. He was in the United States Army from 1953 to 1955, attaining the rank of Corporal. He was an instructor at Alabama State College from 1955 to 1956. He was a claims authorizer for the United States Social Security Administration in Chicago, Illinois, from 1959 to 1960. He was in private practice of law in Atlanta, Georgia, from 1960 to 1974. He was a deputy city attorney of Atlanta from 1969 to 1970. He was an assistant county attorney of Fulton County, Georgia, from 1970 to 1974. He was a member of the Georgia State Senate from 1965 to 1974. He was a Judge of the Civil Court of Fulton County, Georgia from 1974 to 1977. He was a judge of the Superior Court of Georgia from 1977 to 1979.

Federal judicial service

Ward was nominated by President Jimmy Carter on November 1, 1979, to the United States District Court for the Northern District of Georgia, to a new seat created by 92 Stat. 1629. He was confirmed by the United States Senate on December 5, 1979, and received his commission on December 6, 1979. He assumed senior status on December 31, 1993, serving in that status until his death.

Personal life and death

Ward was a member of Alpha Phi Alpha fraternity.

Ward died on April 23, 2016, in Atlanta.

See also 
 List of African-American federal judges
 List of African-American jurists
 List of first minority male lawyers and judges in Georgia

References

External links
 
  (Updated May 7, 2017)

1927 births
2016 deaths
People from LaGrange, Georgia
Morehouse College alumni
Clark Atlanta University alumni
Northwestern University alumni
Alabama State University faculty
University of Arkansas at Pine Bluff faculty
University of Georgia
Georgia (U.S. state) state court judges
Georgia (U.S. state) state senators
African-American judges
Judges of the United States District Court for the Northern District of Georgia
United States district court judges appointed by Jimmy Carter
20th-century American judges